Katlego Thena (born 8 July 1998) is a South African cricketer. He made his Twenty20 debut for Mpumalanga in the 2019–20 CSA Provincial T20 Cup on 15 September 2019.

References

External links
 

1998 births
Living people
South African cricketers
Mpumalanga cricketers
Place of birth missing (living people)